Streptocitta is a genus of large starlings in the family Sturnidae. Both species have a pied plumage and a long tail, giving them a superficial resemblance to a magpie. Although not closely related to the true magpies, they have therefore been referred to as magpies in the past. The two species are restricted to forests in Wallacea in Asia.

Species

References
Coates, B., & Bishop, K. (1997). A Guide to the Birds of Wallacea. Dove Publishing, Alderley, Queensland. 

 
Bird genera
Sturnidae
Taxa named by Charles Lucien Bonaparte
Taxonomy articles created by Polbot